Bisabolenes are a group of closely related natural chemical compounds which are classified as sesquiterpenes.  Bisabolenes are produced from farnesyl pyrophosphate (FPP) and are present in the essential oils of bisabol, and of a wide variety of other plants including cubeb, lemon, and oregano. Various derivates also function as pheromones in different insects, such as stink bugs and fruit flies. Bisabolenes are produced by several fungi, though their biological role in that group of organisms remains unclear.

Three isomers are known, α-, β-, and γ-bisabolene, which differ by the positions of the double bonds.

Uses 
Bisabolenes are intermediates in the biosynthesis of many other natural chemical compounds, including hernandulcin, a natural sweetener. β-Bisabolene has a balsamic odor and is approved in Europe as a food additive.

Bisabolene has been identified as a biologically producible precursor to a diesel fuel alternative and/or cold weather additive bisabolane.

See also 
 Alpha-bisabolene synthase
 (S)-beta-bisabolene synthase
 (E)-gamma-bisabolene synthase
 (Z)-gamma-bisabolene synthase

References

External links
 Beta-bisabolene, NIST Chemistry WebBook listing

Sesquiterpenes
Hydrocarbons
Cyclohexenes